The Libya men's national volleyball team represents Libya in international volleyball competitions and friendly matches.

Results

Olympic Games

1980 — 10th place

World Championship

1982 — 24th place

Arab Volleyball Championship
2012 –  Bronze medal

Men's African Volleyball Championship
1967 - 4th
1979 -  Silver medal
2009 - 6th
2013 - 6th
2017 - 7th

References
 http://www.qurynanew.com/44972

National sports teams of Libya